Yasuoka (written: 安岡 or 保岡) is a Japanese surname. Notable people with the surname include:

, Japanese wheelchair racer
, Japanese scholar
, Japanese general
, Japanese politician
, Japanese actor and singer
, Japanese basketball player
, Japanese writer

Fictional characters
, protagonist of the manga series Shion no Ō

Japanese-language surnames